EGSA may refer to:
 EGSA Alger
 Ethiopia Girl Scout Association
 Egyptian Space Agency
 The ICAO four letter airport code for Shipdham Airfield in Norfolk.